Kvitsøy Tower is the name for the aerial tower of the 1200 kilowatt transmitter of the broadcasting company of Norway for the frequency 1314 kHz, which was built in 1981/82. Kvitsøy-Tower was a 117.5 metres high, free standing centre-fed half-wave antenna constructed of a grounded steel framework. Horizontal crossbars are located at its top and at a height of 67.5 metres above ground to support the cables for a medium wave aerial, which are strung parallel to the tower. The vertical cables hanging from the lower crossbar are fixed to the ground with anchors.

The Norwegian public broadcaster NRK switched off the Kvitsøy transmitter at 22:00 UTC on Friday June 30, 2006.  For years, the station had been heard fairly reliably at night by DX'ers along the Atlantic Coast of North America making it one of the easiest European stations to hear. The mast was demolished on 31 May 2012.

See also 
 List of towers

References

External links 

 
Drawings of Kvitsoy Kringkastar at SkyscraperPage.com
Pages by designer of the antenna Bernd Waniewski
RADIO NORWAY INTERNATIONAL 1938-2003 (In Norwegian)
Bernt Erfjord: Norske Kringkastingssendere(Vintage Norwegian AM Transmitters)(In Norwegian)
Oversikt over Norske Kringkastere utarbeidet ved samarbeid mellom DX-Listeners' Club (DXLC) og Just N. Qvigstad (In Norwegian)

Former radio masts and towers
Transmitter sites in Norway
1982 establishments in Norway
Kvitsøy
Norkring